Constituency WR-12 is a reserved seat for women in the Khyber Pakhtunkhwa Assembly.

See also
 Constituency PK-91 (Upper Dir-I)
 Constituency PK-92 (Upper Dir-II)
 Constituency PK-93 (Upper Dir-III)

References

Khyber Pakhtunkhwa Assembly constituencies